The Promise is the debut album from Christian boy band Plus One. The album features the singles "Written on My Heart", "God Is in This Place", "Last Flight Out" and "Here in My Heart". The album was certified Gold in 2000.

Track listing

Home video
A VHS release titled Plus One: The Home Video was released in 2001 to promote the Promise album.

Backstage Exclusive book
A book, titled Backstage Exclusive, was released in 2001, featuring full-colour photos and facts from Plus One.

Personnel
Nate Cole – vocals
Jason Perry - vocals
Jeremy Mhire - vocals
Nathan Walters – vocals
Gabe Combs – vocals

Michael Hanson - engineering

2000 debut albums
Plus One (band) albums
Atlantic Records albums